Khadra is a town and commune in Mostaganem Province, Algeria. It is located in Achacha District. According to the 1998 census it has a population of 12,294.

References

Communes of Mostaganem Province
Mostaganem Province